Karl August Krazeisen (28 October 1794 Kastellaun – 27 January 1878 Munich) was a Bavarian soldier, philhellene and portraitist.

Biography

Military career 
There is no information regarding Krazeisen's childhood. In 1812 he entered the Bavarian army and took part in the 1813/14 War of the Sixth Coalition. In 1826, having by then promoted to lieutenant, along with 11 other Bavarians he was sent to Greece, where the Greek War of Independence was going through a critical phase, after the troops of the Ottoman Sultan had received assistance from his vassal Muhammad Ali of Egypt. It was the first public action to support the Greek struggle, taken by another European state, as Bavarian King Ludwig I was an ardent philhellene.

Under the command of Charles Nicolas Fabvier, Krazeisen took part in the operations from November 1826 till April 1827 (Siege of the Acropolis and Battle of Phaleron).

On his return to Munich he was promoted to General of the Infantry.

Artist 
Krazeisen was not a professional artist, but having the ability to draw, he used his stay in Greece to create portraits of the heroes of the war, the sketches of camps, costumes, uniforms, battle plans.

He returned to Munich in 1827, published his Greek album, which from 1828 to 1831 was republished seven times His collection, made from life, represents the main pictorial archive of the personalities of the Greek War of Independence.

Subsequently Krazeisen was honoured by Greece with the Order of the Redeemer.

Gallery

Literature 
 Hajo Knebel: EberhardKieser, Karl Krazeisen, Eduard Bäumer — drei Künstler aus Kastellaun in der Kunstgeschichte. — In: HunsrückerHeimatblätter. — 1989. S. 338—341. — 1989.
 Georg Kaspar Nagler, Neues allgemeines Künstler-Lexicon 1839, S. 168

References

External links 

 Information on the Greek parliament website
 Kathimerini article of January 2, 2006: "Greek heroes’ images recorded"
 Ethnos-online of October 14, 2008: "The photographer of the heroes of '21» (in Greek)

German philhellenes in the Greek War of Independence
1794 births
1878 deaths
German war artists
Bavarian generals
German military personnel of the Napoleonic Wars